Bhujel or Gharti is a caste group in Nepal.

The inhabitants living near the Bhuji Khola river called Bhujel. Bhujel are divided into four subcaste – Bhujyal, Gharti, Nisel and Khawas. Most of the Bhujel of Nepal speaks Nepali language but some of them also speak Bhujel language.

References

Ethnic groups in Nepal